Kinton Knob is a peak in Bedford County, Pennsylvania. Kinton Knob marks the north end of Wills Mountain where it abruptly ends just southwest of the town of Bedford. The mountain has an array of communication towers on its summit. Limited views are available from the top, especially in the winter season, of Blue Knob to the north and the Allegheny Front to the west.

References
 

Mountains of Pennsylvania
Mountains of Bedford County, Pennsylvania